Vera Sidika Mungasia (born 30 September 1989)  is a Kenyan television and social media personality, celebrity, video vixen entrepreneur, and socialite. Born and raised in Mombasa, Sidika gained media attention in her career when she appeared in P-Unit's single, "You Guy", released in 2012. She has been voted as one of Africa's and East Africa's top video vixens. She is regarded as one of Kenya's most controversial women due to her extraordinary and lavish lifestyle and unique opinions about life in general. In 2015, she and her fellow socialites began to appear in the reality television series Nairobi Diaries.

Early life and education 
Vera Sidika started her career at the age of 17 when she worked as a plus size model, participating in contests and fashion shows.

She moved to Nairobi in 2009 where she joined Kenyatta University with an intention to pursue her studies in art and design; this gave her an opportunity to fully take her career to the next level.

Career 
Sidika rose to fame in 2012 when she featured as the video girl in P-Unit's single "You Guy". In 2014, she appeared in Prezzo's single, "My Gal". In November 2015, she appeared as a video vixen in a video by Nigerian musicians KCSkiibii and Harrysong titled "Ebaeno". She has been featured by The New York Post and BBC Africa.

On May 21, 2017 she launched Veetox tea, a herbal detox claimed to help reduce bloating, clean the digestive system, improve metabolism and burn belly fat.

Personal life 

In 2014, Sidika admitted that she had lightened her skin in the UK. She refuted claims that the procedure was not safe and could affect her medically. She said the procedure cost her over ksh15 million. She stated to anchor Larry Madowo, "My body is my business and it is a money-maker."

Filmography 
As of December 2015, Sidika and other Kenyan social media personalities, including fashion stylist Silvia Njoki, musician and actress Ella Ciru, NGO ambassador and student Gertrude Murunga, architect Kiki Diang’a, fitness instructor Marjolein Blokland and socialite and singer Pendo, starred in the reality television series Nairobi Diaries. The show delves into the women's day-to-day lives.

Awards and nominations

References

1989 births
Living people
Kenyan female models
People from Mombasa
Kenyan socialites
Participants in Kenyan reality television series